Mary Huntoon (born Mary Huntoon Atkinson; 1896–1970) was an American artist and art therapist. The Mary Huntoon Papers are located at the University of Kansas. It consists primarily of her personal correspondences, correspondences as director of the Federal Art Project in Kansas, original poetry manuscripts, speech and lecture notes, photographs or reproductions of her artwork, original artwork, inventories, exhibit catalogs and programs, information on employment and research as an Art Therapist at Winter V.A. Hospital, and family photographs.

Huntoon resided in Paris during the interwar period. She was friends with Stanley William Hayter to whom she gave printmaking lessons in the spring of 1926. She taught Hayter the aquatint process, and the engravings the two produced around this time are comparable in their use of pure line and depiction of familiar Parisian scenes. Huntoon's first exhibition opened on 15 July 1928 at the Sacre du Printemps Gallery in Paris, and drew large crowds. 

Huntoon ultimately returned to Kansas where she worked as an art teacher, head of the Kansas Federal Art Project and as an art therapist. She has a collection in The Newark Museum of Art, Smithsonian American Art Museum, and the Philadelphia Museum of Art.

References

1896 births
1970 deaths
20th-century American women artists
Artists from Topeka, Kansas
Art therapists
Federal Art Project administrators